The 2009 Leeds refuse workers strike was an eleven-week industrial dispute in City of Leeds, West Yorkshire, England between Leeds City Council and the city's binmen.

Background
The strike began on 7 September 2009  and was over the city council's plans to equalise the pay of men and women, which some workers argued would see considerable reductions in their wages.

Council reactions
On 27 October 2009, with the strike having lasted for eight weeks, the council began advertising for new refuse workers. The council said it was advertising for staff in order to meet its target of a fortnightly black bin collection.

Resolution
In November 2009 Leeds City Council put fresh proposals to union members which would see 20 staff getting a pay cut, but most workers receiving small increases. At a secret ballot of about 600 union members on Monday 23 November, 79% voted in favour of the proposals and refuse workers returned to work on the morning of Wednesday 25 November. The first bin collections took place the following day.

References

Leeds refuse workers strike
Leeds Refuse Workers Strike, 2009
2000s in Leeds
Economy of Leeds
Labour disputes in England
September 2009 events in the United Kingdom
October 2009 events in the United Kingdom